Gertrude Beals Bourne (1868–1962) was an American artist.

Bourne was known as a landscape painter and for her gardening work; she was the founder Boston's Beacon Hill Garden Club.  She studied art privately beginning about 1890, first with Henry Rice and then with Henry B. Snell, a founding member of the New York Watercolor Club. She preferred to paint in Gouche and watercolor. In 1904 she married the architect Frank Bourne. They lived together in a home known as Sunflower Castle, in Boston's Beacon Hill neighborhood. 

The 2004 book Gertrude Beals Bourne: Artist in Brahmin Boston (1868-1962) is devoted to her work.

Collections
Her work is included in the collections of the Museum of Fine Arts, Boston and the Smithsonian American Art Museum.

References

1868 births
1962 deaths
19th-century American women artists
20th-century American women artists
American watercolorists
Artists from Boston
American gardeners